Obrador or Obradors is a surname. Notable people with the surname include:

Andrés Manuel López Obrador (born 1953), president of Mexico
Fernando Obradors (1897-1945), Spanish composer
Jacqueline Obradors (born 1966), American actress
Manuela Obrador (born 1971), Mexican politician
Rafael Obrador (born 2004), Spanish footballer

Spanish-language surnames